Thomas or Tom Molyneux (sometimes Molineux or Molineaux)  may refer to:

 Thomas Molyneux (statesman) (1531–1597), French-born statesman in Ireland
 Sir Thomas Molyneux, 1st Baronet, (1661–1733), Irish physician
 Thomas Molineux (luthier) (–1757), Irish luthier
 Thomas Molineux (stenographer) (1759–1850), English stenographer
 Tom Molineaux (1784–1818), African bare-knuckle boxer
 Tom Molyneux (1890–1955), Canadian ice hockey player

See also
Tim Molyneux (born 1969), American actor, singer, writer, director and producer